Madison Municipal Airport  is a public airport located  west of Madison, in Jefferson County, Indiana, United States.

Facilities 
For the 12-month period ending December 31, 2014 the airport had 7,975 aircraft operations, an average of 22 per day: 86% general aviation, 8% air taxi and 6% military. In January 2017, there were 49 aircraft based at this airport: 45 single-engine and 4 multi-engine.

References

External links 
 
 
 

Airports in Indiana
Transportation buildings and structures in Jefferson County, Indiana